Green October Event 2017 was the 3rd edition of Green October Event held on 1 October 2017 at Oriental Hotel, Victoria Island, Lagos, Nigeria.

Belinda Effah and Caesar Ume-Ezeoke hosted the fashion show, while Efex and Nancy Isime hosted the gala night. Marvis and Soma of Big Brother Naija season 2 performed at the event. It was focused on children living with cerebral palsy in Nigeria.

Fashion designers that showcased their designs were House of Kosagh, Agatha Moreno, Sammielle Couture, Bella House of Fab, Hope Fashion, Gmyt Fashion Academy, JPKOUTURE, Visible Proof, Facinator by Omoge, Makioba, House of Beth, Dunskani Design and Novjok Couture.

The exhibitors were Fashionjunkie Collection, Kelu, On-Ru Couture, Ma Bello Clothier, Mojisola Alankara, Bunaj, Be Fab by Beadakraft, Zandikam Visage, Yetrose Lane and Accost Collection.

Award recipients
The third edition of Green October Event was held on 1 October 2017 at Oriental Hotel, Victoria Island, Lagos, Nigeria.

NHN Couture- Fashion Designer of the Year
Lapearl NYC- Fashion Stylist of the Year
Aderonke  Enoabasi- Fashion Influencer of the Year
House of Kosagh- Creative Fast Rising Fashion Designer of the Year
Jennifer Alegieuno- Outstanding Fashion Entrepreneur of the Year
Mai Atafo- Fashion Brand CEO of the Year
H.O.P.E Fashion- Fashion Entrepreneur of the Year
Ndubisi Ike of Benzik Media- Graphic Artist of the Year
The Irede Foundation- Humanitarian Foundation of the Year
Ebube Nwagbo- Most Fashionable Female Celebrity of the Year
Toyin Abraham- Humanitarian Celebrity of the Year
Dora Enwere- Humanitarian of the Year
Sandra Onyinyechukwu- Humanitarian Beauty Queen of the Year
Nouva Couture- Most Versatile Fashion Designer of the Year
Olukokun Adepeju- Humanitarian Icon of the Year
Chris Okagbue- Most Fashionable Male Celebrity of the Year
JpKouture- Plus Size Fashion Designer of the Year
Makioba- Plus Size Pace Setter of the Year
Toyin Lawani- Fashion Icon of the Year
Wanneka- Beauty Entrepreneur of the Year
Jojos Touch- MUA of the Year
YemiDisu of Four23 Photography- Entrepreneur of the Year
Princess K. Oghene- Enterprising Fashion Designer of the Year

Special recognition awards
Studio24 Nigeria- For the Support in the Fashion and Entertainment Industry
Aso Multimedia- For Contribution in Fashion and Pageantry
Florence Ita Giwa- For Contribution to the Welfare of the Children of Bakassi
Rosaline Meurer- For Ambassadorial Support for Mother and Child in Nigeria
Olakunle Churchill- Lifetime Humanitarian Award for Youth Empowerment
Kenneth Ovayabor Akpaka- For Contribution to the Development of Entrepreneurs in Nigeria
F.E.B Idahosa- For Contribution to Entrepreneurial Growth in Nigeria
Femi Gbadebo- For Support to Humanity
Jessica Okanlawon- For Humanitarian Support to Humanity

References

Nigerian awards
Business and industry awards
Awards for contributions to society
Humanitarian and service awards